The Alfa Romeo New York Taxi is a concept car designed by Italdesign in 1976 at the invitation of the New York Museum of Modern Art. The concept was designed to a brief from the museum aimed at producing a cleaner, more efficient taxi.

The taxi featured flat floor space for wheelchair storage under the seats and sliding doors on both sides, making it one of the first cars to have this feature. It was based on the front-wheel-drive running gear of the Alfa Romeo F12 van, including a 1.3-litre petrol engine and independent suspension in both the front and rear. 

Some of the design principles explored in the taxi were expanded upon with the Lancia Megagamma, which was a less boxy, more streamlined prototype that gave form to the modern multi-purpose vehicle (MPV).

References

See also 

 Volvo City Taxi

New York Taxi
Italdesign concept vehicles

Taxi vehicles
Minivans